The STacy is a portable computer version of the Atari ST.

The computer was originally designed to operate on 12 standard C cell flashlight batteries for portability. When Atari realized how quickly the machine would use up a set of batteries (especially when rechargeable batteries of the time supplied insufficient power compared to the intended alkalines), they simply glued the lid of the battery compartment shut.

The STacy has features similar to the Macintosh Portable, a version of Apple's Macintosh computer which contained a built in keyboard and monitor.

With built-in MIDI, the STacy enjoyed success for running music-sequencer software and as a controller of musical instruments among both amateurs and well-known musicians.

History
The Stacy was a global project, design work was carried out in the Sunnyvale HQ, Cambridge UK, final PCB layouts were produced by Atari in Japan, which is where the first units were manufactured, with final manufacturing occurring in Taiwan.

The distinctive sculptured charcoal-gray case was designed by Ira Velinsky, Atari's chief Industrial Designer.

Models
There are 4 STacy Models
 Stacy : 1 MB Ram, 1× 3.5" internal Floppy (Model code: LST-1141)
 Stacy 2: 2 MB Ram, 1× 3.5" internal Floppy, 20 MB HD (Model code: LST-2144)
 Stacy 2: 2 MB Ram, 2× 3.5" internal Floppy (Model code: LST-2124)
 Stacy 4: 4 MB Ram, 1× 3.5" internal Floppy, 40 MB HD (Model code: LST-4144)

Specifications
 Atari TOS 1.04
 Blitter
 Character set: Atari ST character set (based on codepage 437)
 Real-time clock lithium battery
 Hard disk: ACSI-SCSI 20-40 MB
 Floppy disk
 ACSI, ACSI internal (same as in Mega STE)
 Trackball

Ports
 Parallel: 1 port
 Serial: 1 port
 FDD: 1 port
 MIDI: 2 ports

Optional
 Modem

In pop culture
The STacy appears in the 1991 films Nothing but Trouble and Delusion.

Gallery

References

External links

Atari History Museum
Atari Stacy computer
A Stacy user page Overview, screen captures, photos.
STacy Owners Manual - Addendum(1990)
 

Products introduced in 1989
Atari ST
Portable computers